was a town located in Tōhaku District, Tottori Prefecture, Japan.

As of 2003, the town had an estimated population of 8,101 and a density of 140.40 persons per km2. The total area was 57.70 km2.

On September 1, 2004, Akasaki, along with the town of Tōhaku (also from Tōhaku District), was merged to create the town of Kotoura.

See also
 Akasaki Railway Station

External links
Kotoura official website 

Dissolved municipalities of Tottori Prefecture
Tōhaku District, Tottori
Kotoura, Tottori